Elizabeth Herbert, Countess of Pembroke, Countess of Montgomery (January/March 1737 – 30 April 1831) was the daughter of Charles Spencer and Elizabeth Trevor.

Biography

Born Elizabeth Spencer to Charles Spencer, 3rd Duke of Marlborough and Elizabeth Trevor.

Her siblings were George, Charles, and Diana.

In 1756, aged nineteen, she married Henry Herbert, 10th Earl of Pembroke. In 1762, he left her to elope with another woman.

"Husbands are dreadfull and powerful animals," wrote the long-suffering Elizabeth after reconciling with her husband in 1762. She refused to allow his illegitimate son from that affair to keep the surname Herbert, and she and Henry ended up living in separate quarters at Wilton (he downstairs, she upstairs).

She was admired by George III in the early 1760s, becoming a Lady of the Bedchamber to his wife, Queen Charlotte.  The King and Queen stayed for two nights with Henry and Elizabeth at Wilton House in 1778.

She would eventually move to Pembroke Lodge in Richmond Park in 1788, which King George had put at her disposal.  However, the King – who had been attracted to Elizabeth as long as he had known her – suffered his first bout of insanity that same year, and she had to endure the embarrassment of his sporadic and unwanted attentions until his recovery later that year.

Issue

In fiction
She features in the movie The Madness of King George (1994) played by Amanda Donohoe.
It is set in 1788, and so she was actually much older than portrayed.
Its mention of a mother-in-law who "lost her wits" is an invention, since her mother-in-law Mary Fitzwilliam died in 1769.
the King introduces her: "Now, that's Lady Pembroke. Handsome woman, what? Daughter of the Duke of Marlborough. Stuff of generals. Blood of Blenheim. Husband an utter rascal. Eloped in a packet-boat.",
the movie shows the mad King harassing her, but she (and the Queen) remaining loyal to him.

Sources
Humphrys family tree
Henry, Elizabeth and George: Letters and Diaries of Henry, 10th Earl of Pembroke and his Circle (1734–80), 16th Earl, 1939, repub as: The Pembroke Papers vol. I (1734–80), 1942–50.
The Pembroke Papers vol. II (1780–94), 16th Earl, 1950, [EUL] 9(42073) Pem.

1737 births
1831 deaths
British and English royal favourites
English countesses
Daughters of British dukes
Elizabeth Herbert, Countess of Pembroke and Montgomery
Ladies of the Bedchamber
Court of George III of the United Kingdom
Residents of Pembroke Lodge, Richmond Park